The Swedish Anarcho-Syndicalist Youth Federation, (Syndikalistiska Ungdomsförbundet) (SUF) is a youth-based group in Sweden that supports independent working class struggle.

The federation was founded in 1993, in part rooted in the militant autonomous youth movement that had begun to grow throughout Scandinavia in the early 1990s.

Inspiration also came from the anarcho-syndicalist trade union Central Organisation of the Workers of Sweden. From just three groups in 1993 it grew rapidly and today it is a nationwide federation made up of around 25 local groups, located throughout the entire country. Aside from the Samordningsgruppen, SOG; whose purpose is nothing but to coordinate the activities of the local clubs, several other committees serve various purposes within the federation, such as production of propaganda. Ever since the early 1990s, the SUF published a magazine called Direkt Aktion.

SUF is, in contrast to its anarcho-syndicalist beliefs, not a union. Their idea of anarcho-syndicalism expands beyond the daily labour union activity, and claims that in a global community where capitalist relations have expanded into all parts of society, a broader movement and a broader definition of class struggle is needed. Thus, they believe it is necessary to confront capitalism not only in workplaces, but also in schools, universities, local communities, etc.

Campaigns

Planka.nu 

The network Planka.nu (Fare-dodge.now) was initially initiated as a campaign by SUF in 2001. The campaign (and later independent initiative) dealt with public transportation, seeking a shift from soaring prices to a tax-financed model. The campaign got a lot of attention because of the unorthodox methods; Planka.nu encourage people to fare-dodge in the public transport and organizes an insurance fund, p-kassan, that pays the fines of its members it they get caught fare-dodging.

Nu jävlar är det nog 
Nu jävlar är det nog (It's enough now, damnit), was a nationwide anti-racist campaign initiated by SUF on August 24, 2004 and ended February 1, 2005. It claimed to be different from other anti-racist campaigns in that it also took in account factors such as social class.

Klasskampen tar inte semester 
Klasskampen tar inte semester - "There is no vacation for the class struggle" - was SUF's nationwide campaign about summer jobs. It lasted for five months, from May 1 to October 1, 2005. It was criticized for allegedly encouraging people to commit illegal acts.

Osynliga Partiet 

The nationwide campaign Osynliga partiet (the Invisible Party) was partly initiated by SUF. The campaign first received media attention when winner of the political reality show Toppkandidaterna, Petter Nilsson, donated part of his prize to SUF for financing part of the campaign, which was heavily criticized after the offices of the Centre Party were vandalized following their announcement of their intention to dismantle the Employment Security Act, with the logo of the campaign found at the site. In addition to this, a few offices of the Christian Democrats were also attacked.

See also 
 Central Organisation of the Workers of Sweden, Sveriges Arbetares Centralorganisation
 Invisible Party, Osynliga Partiet - a campaign initiated by SUF
 Direkt Aktion

References

External links 
 Official website
A short introduction to SUF

Politics of Sweden
Anarchist organizations in Sweden
Youth organizations established in 1993
1993 establishments in Sweden
Anarchist Federations